The William E. Simon Prize for Philanthropic Leadership is an annual award given by the William E. Simon Foundation in honor of its founder, former Secretary of the Treasury and financier William E. Simon, and administered by the Philanthropy Roundtable.

The award was created in 2000, first awarded in 2001, and is given to "highlight the power of philanthropy to promote positive change and to inspire others to support charities that achieve genuine results." The prize is given to living donors who have "shown exemplary leadership through their own charitable giving, either directly or through foundations they have created." Donors who receive the prize are expected to exemplify Simon's ideals, which include "personal responsibility, resourcefulness, volunteerism, scholarship, individual freedom, faith in God, and helping people to help themselves."

The Simon Prize carries a $250,000 purse, which is awarded to the charity or charities of the recipient's choice.

The Simon Prize is presented at the Philanthropy Roundtable's Annual Meeting.

List of recipients

External links
Information about and list of winners of the William E. Simon Prize

References 

American awards
Charity in the United States